James Bannister (20 September 1880 – 18 December 1953) was an English footballer. Bannister was purchased by Manchester United from Manchester City in 1906. He helped the club win the 1908 league championship. He left United in 1909 to go to Preston North End.

1880 births
1953 deaths
People from Leyland, Lancashire
English footballers
Association football inside forwards
Chorley F.C. players
Manchester City F.C. players
Manchester United F.C. players
Preston North End F.C. players
Heywood F.C. players
English Football League players